Feminina is an album by the Brazilian singer Joyce that was released by Odeon in 1980.

The album includes the track "Clareana", which was written for her daughters, Clara Moreno and Ana Martins. The singer entered Festival MPB 80 and reached the finals with the song, which went on to achieve her first chart success in Brazil. "Aldeia de Ogum" was popularized as a dance track in the 1990s by Gilles Peterson.

The album cover was signed by photographer Luiz Fernando and his wife Luhli. It depicts Moreno without make up and playing her acoustic guitar. According to Moreno herself in a 2019 interview, although the guitar is not seen in the image, it is present through her look, which is the typical look of a musician to their instrument. The album logo, in which an acoustic guitar is drawn from the letter "f", became a symbol of the singer.

Track listing

Personnel
 Joyce – vocals, classical guitar
 Mauro Senise – flute, saxophone
 Danilo Caymmi – flute
 Jorginho – flute
 Paulo Guimaraes – flute
 Helvius Vilela – piano
 Helio Delmiro – guitar
 Claudio Guimaraes – guitar
 Fernando Leporace – bass guitar, vocals
 Tutti Moreno – drums, percussion
 Lize Bravo – vocals

References

1980 albums
Joyce Moreno (musician) albums